Coach's challenge may refer to:

 Replay review in gridiron football
 The rule allowing teams to challenge fouls in basketball
 Instant replay in Major League Baseball